The Australian Journal of Botany is a peer-reviewed scientific journal published by CSIRO Publishing. It covers all areas of plant biology, with a focus on Southern Hemisphere ecosystems. The editor-in-chief is Dick Williams (Commonwealth Scientific and Industrial Research Organisation).

Abstracting and indexing
The journal is abstracted and indexed in AGRICOLA, Elsevier Biobase, BIOSIS Previews, CAB Abstracts, Chemical Abstracts Service, Current Contents/Agriculture, Biology & Environmental Sciences, Science Citation Index, and Scopus. According to the Journal Citation Reports, the journal has a 2020 impact factor of 1.24.

References

External links

Botany journals of Australia
CSIRO Publishing academic journals
Publications established in 1953
English-language journals
8 times per year journals
1953 establishments in Australia